Todd Bjornethun is a retired American professional mixed martial artist. He competed for Shooto and Pancrase.

Mixed martial arts record

|-
| Win
| align=center| 7-5
| Kazuhiro Kusayanagi
| TKO (punches)
| Shooto: Reconquista 4
| 
| align=center| 2
| align=center| 4:01
| Tokyo, Japan
| 
|-
| Loss
| align=center| 6-5
| Allan Goes
| Submission (triangle choke)
| EF 4: Extreme Fighting 4
| 
| align=center| 1
| align=center| 0:30
| Des Moines, Iowa, United States
| 
|-
| Win
| align=center| 6-4
| Rudyard Moncayo
| Submission (heel hook)
| EF 3: Extreme Fighting 3
| 
| align=center| 1
| align=center| 0:00
| Tulsa, Oklahoma, United States
| 
|-
| Win
| align=center| 5-4
| Eric Lavigne
| KO (punches)
| VTJ 1996: Vale Tudo Japan 1996
| 
| align=center| 1
| align=center| 6:53
| Urayasu, Chiba, Japan
| 
|-
| Win
| align=center| 4-4
| Akihiro Gono
| Submission (armbar)
| Shooto: Vale Tudo Junction 3
| 
| align=center| 3
| align=center| 1:12
| Tokyo, Japan
| 
|-
| Loss
| align=center| 3-4
| Erik Paulson
| Submission (guillotine choke)
| Shooto: Vale Tudo Junction 1
| 
| align=center| 2
| align=center| 0:26
| Tokyo, Japan
|Middleweight debut.
|-
| Win
| align=center| 3-3
| Orlando Wiet
| Submission (triangle choke)
| UFCF: United Full Contact Federation 1
| 
| align=center| 1
| align=center| 5:43
| 
| 
|-
| Loss
| align=center| 2-3
| Masakatsu Funaki
| Submission (armbar)
| Pancrase: King of Pancrase Tournament Opening Round
| 
| align=center| 1
| align=center| 2:20
| Tokyo, Japan
| 
|-
| Win
| align=center| 2-2
| Vernon White
| Decision (lost points)
| Pancrase: Road To The Championship 5
| 
| align=center| 1
| align=center| 15:00
| Tokyo, Japan
| 
|-
| Loss
| align=center| 1-2
| Minoru Suzuki
| Submission (armbar)
| Pancrase: Road To The Championship 4
| 
| align=center| 1
| align=center| 3:11
| Osaka, Osaka, Japan
| 
|-
| Win
| align=center| 1-1
| Gregory Smit
| Decision (unanimous)
| Pancrase: Road To The Championship 3
| 
| align=center| 1
| align=center| 15:00
| Tokyo, Japan
| 
|-
| Loss
| align=center| 0-1
| Ryushi Yanagisawa
| Submission (heel hook)
| Pancrase: Pancrash! 2
| 
| align=center| 1
| align=center| 7:12
| Nagoya, Aichi, Japan
|

See also
List of male mixed martial artists

References

External links
 
 Todd Bjornethun at mixedmartialarts.com
 Todd Bjornethun at fightmatrix.com

American male mixed martial artists
Middleweight mixed martial artists
Light heavyweight mixed martial artists
Heavyweight mixed martial artists
Living people
Year of birth missing (living people)